Cynometra cubensis is a species of plant in the family Fabaceae. It is found only in Cuba. It is threatened by habitat loss.

References

cubensis
Endemic flora of Cuba
Endangered plants
Taxonomy articles created by Polbot